The Penn-Ohio Conference was a college swimming conference from at least 1941-1998.

Members
Ashland University
California University of Pennsylvania
Carnegie-Mellon University
Cleveland State University
Edinboro University
Fairmont State University
Gannon University
Grove City College
Indiana University of Pennsylvania
Mercyhurst University
Slippery Rock University
Transylvania University
University of Akron
University of Findlay
Valparaiso University
Westminster College
Wright State University
Youngstown State University
West Virginia Wesleyan College
Wheeling Jesuit University

Sources:

Champions
Sources:

Men's Champions
1941-42 - Westminster
1942-43 -
1943-44 -
1944-45 -
1945-46 -
1946-47 -
1947-48 - Westminster
1948-49 -
1949-50 -
1950-51 -
1951-52 -
1952-53 -
1953-54 - Grove City
1954-55 -
1955-56 -
1956-57 - Slippery Rock
1957-58 -
1958-59 -
1959-60 -
1960-61 -
1961-62 - Grove City
1962-63 - Grove City
1963-64 - Grove City
1964-65 - Grove City
1965-66 - Grove City
1966-67 - Grove City
1967-68 - Grove City
1968-69 -
1969-70 -
1970-71 -
1971-72 -
1972-73 -
1973-74 - Cleveland State
1974-75 -
1975-76 - Cleveland State
1976-77 - Cleveland State
1977-78 - Cleveland State
1978-79 - Cleveland State
1979-80 - Cleveland State
1980-81 - Cleveland State
1981-82 - Cleveland State
1982-83 - Cleveland State
1983-84 - Cleveland State
1984-85 - Cleveland State
1985-86 - Cleveland State
1986-87 -
1987-88 -
1988-89 -
1989-90 - Cleveland State
1990-91 - Cleveland State
1991-92 - Cleveland State
1992-93 - Westminster
1993-94 - Westminster
1994-95
1995-96 -
1996-97 -
1997-98 -

Women's Champions
1980-81 -
1981-82 -
1982-83 -
1983-84 -
1984-85 -
1985-86 -
1986-87 -
1987-88 -
1988-89 -
1989-90 - Cleveland State
1990-91 - Cleveland State
1991-92 - Westminster
1992-93 - 
1993-94 - 
1995-96 -
1996-97 -
1997-98 -

References

Sports in the Midwestern United States
Defunct NCAA Division I conferences
1941 establishments in the United States
1998 disestablishments in the United States
Sports leagues established in 1941
Sports leagues disestablished in 1998